Tryfonivka is a village in Beryslav Raion (district) in Kherson Oblast of southern Ukraine, about  northeast of Kharkiv. It belongs to Velyka Oleksandrivka settlement hromada, one of the hromadas of Ukraine.

The village came under attack by Russian forces in 2022 during the Russian invasion of Ukraine and was regained by Ukrainian forces on 6 October 2022.

References

Villages in Beryslav Raion